Yerucham ben Meshullam (1290–1350), often called Rabbenu Yerucham, was a prominent rabbi and posek during the period of the Rishonim.

Biography
Yerucham was born in Provence, France. Initially he lived in Languedoc. In 1306, after the Jewish expulsion from France, he moved to Toledo, Spain. During this time of his life, he became a student of Rabbi Asher ben Jehiel.

In the year 1330, he began writing his work Sefer Maysharim, which deals with civil law. He completed this work in four years.

At the end of his life, he wrote Sefer Toldos Adam V'Chava. This work is divided into two parts. The first is entitled "Adam", and covers the laws that apply before marriage, such as laws of circumcision, instruction, prayer, and Shabbat. The second part, entitled "Havah", deals with the laws that become obligatory at and after marriage, such as those connected with betrothal, marriage, etc.

Many of his rulings were codified in the Shulchan Aruch. He greatly influenced Rabbi Yosef Karo. He is quoted extensively by Rav Karo in both the Shulchan Aruch and Beit Yosef (Tur Choshen Mishpat 29:3 for a 'small' example of the latter).

References

 Its bibliography:
Abraham Zacuto, Yuḥasin, p. 224, ed. Filipowski;
Geiger's Jüd. Zeit. iii. 284;
Steinschneider, Cat. Bodl. col. 1384;
Renan-Neubauer, Les Ecrivains Juifs Français, pp. 221 et seq.;
Gross, Gallia Judaica, p. 490.G. I. Br.

1290 births
1350 deaths
French Orthodox rabbis
Provençal Jews
Exponents of Jewish law
Authors of books on Jewish law
14th-century French rabbis